Glamis Meadow and Wood is a 9.5 hectare Local Nature Reserve in Wellingborough in Northamptonshire. It was previously owned and managed by Borough of Wellingborough.

A stream runs through this site, which has woodland and grassland. Facilities include a cycle path, seating and information boards.

There is access from Hardwick Road and The Promenade.

References

Local Nature Reserves in Northamptonshire